Heather Headley (born October 5, 1974) is a Trinidadian-born American singer, songwriter, record producer and actress. She won the 2000 Tony Award for Best Actress in a Musical for the titular role of Aida. She also won the 2010 Grammy Award for Best Contemporary R&B Gospel Album for her album Audience of One. In 2018, she recurred as Gwen Garrett on the NBC medical drama television series Chicago Med.

Personal life
Headley was born in Trinidad, the daughter of Hannah and Eric Headley (Barbadian). In 1989, she moved to Fort Wayne, Indiana, in the United States at the age of fifteen with her mother and brother Eric Junior when her father was offered a job as pastor of McKee Street Church of God with headquarters in Anderson, Indiana. Headley attended Northrop High School, and was a member of their resident show choir, Charisma, and starred as Fanny Brice in the school's production of Funny Girl. After graduating from high school, Headley attended Northwestern University from 1993 to 1996, to study communications and musical theatre until the last day of her junior year, when she made the decision to become a part of the musical Ragtime and drop out of school.

In 2003, Headley married Brian Musso, an investment advisor who briefly played for the New York Jets. Both attended Northwestern University. On December 1, 2009, they welcomed their first child John David. Headley had her second son Jordan Chase August 18, 2014.  In April 2019, the couple welcomed a third child, a daughter.

Headley regularly performs with Vertical Church Band, the worship team from Harvest Bible Chapel. She is featured in their song "How Great Is The Love" and "All Glory".

Career
Headley's stage career began in 1996 when she was cast as a member of the ensemble in the original Toronto production of the musical Ragtime where she was an understudy for Audra McDonald in the role of Sarah. Her breakthrough came the following year when she originated the role of Nala in the Broadway musical The Lion King. Headley's performance was well received, and she then originated the title role in the Broadway adaptation of Aida, earning the Tony Award for Best Actress in 2000. In 1999, she appeared in the Encores! staged concert production of Do Re Mi, with Nathan Lane, Randy Graff, and Brian Stokes Mitchell. She starred in an Actors' Fund of America benefit concert version of the musical Dreamgirls alongside McDonald and Lillias White in 2001.

In the autumn of 2006, Heather performed Hal David and Burt Bacharach's song "I'll Never Fall In Love Again", from the 1968 musical Promises, Promises, for "The Kennedy Center Presents: The 2006 Mark Twain Prize", honoring playwright Neil Simon. The ceremony was later broadcast on PBS.

On July 5, 2007, Headley made a guest appearance for Andrea Bocelli's Vivere Live in Tuscany concert in Lajatico, Italy. They performed Vivo Per Lei and The Prayer. Headley sang "My Country, 'Tis of Thee" (also known as "America") with Josh Groban on January 18, 2009, during the We Are One: The Obama Inaugural Celebration at the Lincoln Memorial. On March 12, 2009, Headley sang "I Wish" on The Tonight Show with Jay Leno.

From November 2012 until August 2013, Headley played the role of Rachel Marron, in the musical adaptation of Whitney Houston's 1992 movie, The Bodyguard at London's Adelphi Theatre. She was nominated for an Olivier Award and a What's On Stage Award for this performance.

Heather joined the Andrea Bocelli UK Tour playing Glasgow Hydro on November 23 and at the Leeds First Direct Arena on November 24, 2013.

On May 10, 2016, Headley assumed the role of Shug Avery from Jennifer Hudson in the recent Broadway revival of The Color Purple, which closed on January 8, 2017, at the Bernard B. Jacobs Theatre.

From 2017, Headley is co-starring in Spike Lee's Netflix reboot of She's Gotta Have It as Dr Jamison. 
She also voices of the part of Fikiri as Makini's Mother in The Lion Guard.

In May 2022, Headley played the Witch in the Encores! version of Into the Woods. She starred alongside Sara Bareilles, Neil Patrick Harris, Gavin Creel, and Denée Benton.

Music
Headley released her debut album, This Is Who I Am, in October 2002 with RCA Records. Although its first single, "He Is", was not very successful, the second single, "I Wish I Wasn't", achieved moderate success. The work on this album earned her a Grammy Award nomination for Best Female R&B Vocal Performance and for Best New Artist making her the first Tony Award winner to be nominated for this award.

Her second album, In My Mind (2006) was delayed due to the various executive shake-ups associated with RCA parent BMG's merger with Sony. Under BMG North America chairman/CEO Clive Davis for the first time, Headley released her second album In My Mind in January 2006. The title track "In My Mind" (written and produced by India.Arie collaborator Shannon Sanders) was released as the first single; and its music video was directed by Diane Martel.  The song reached number-one on the U.S. Hot Dance Music/Club Play chart. The second single "Me Time" was sent to Urban AC radio only. An album track, "Am I Worth It", served to promote Headley's New March of Dimes Educational Campaign "I Want My 9 Months".

In 2009, Headley, along with Al Green, released a version of the song "People Get Ready" on the compilation album Oh Happy Day: An All-Star Music Celebration.

In January 2010 she won her first Grammy Award for Best Contemporary R&B Gospel Album for Audience of One on the EMI Gospel label.

In December 2010, Headley performed a duet version of "Blue Christmas" and "My Prayer" with Italian tenor Andrea Bocelli on his "My Christmas" tour in 5 US cities. At the Prudential Center in Newark, NJ, on December 4, 2010, the audience insisted on a second encore with Bocelli. Bocelli had to summon the detail to go and bring her back on stage.

Headley released her album Only One in the World on September 25, 2012, with the lead single "A Little While".

In September 2013, Headley appeared on America's Got Talent with Il Divo and sang "Can You Feel the Love Tonight?" from The Lion King. She also appeared with Il Divo on Broadway for a limited concert run in 2013.

Acting
In 2017, Headley appeared in a recurring role on the TV series She's Gotta Have It. In 2018, she appeared in a recurring role as Gwen Garrett on the TV series Chicago Med.

In 2019, Headley was cast as one of the three leads in the Netflix series Sweet Magnolias.

In 2021, Headley starred as gospel legend Clara Ward in Respect, the Aretha Franklin biopic.

Discography

Studio albums

Compilation albums

Singles

Other

Filmography

Film

Television

Awards and nominations

Music

Theatre

References

External links
 Official website

1974 births
Living people
American film actresses
Trinidad and Tobago emigrants to the United States
Record producers from New York (state)
American stage actresses
Grammy Award winners
American neo soul singers
Northwestern University School of Communication alumni
Actors from Fort Wayne, Indiana
Tony Award winners
21st-century Trinidad and Tobago women singers
21st-century Trinidad and Tobago singers
Trinidad and Tobago record producers
Trinidad and Tobago stage actresses
Drama Desk Award winners
American musical theatre actresses
21st-century American actresses
20th-century American actresses
Actresses from Indiana
Musicians from Fort Wayne, Indiana
Writers from Fort Wayne, Indiana
21st-century Trinidad and Tobago actresses
21st-century American women singers
21st-century American singers
American contemporary R&B singers
Ballad musicians
American women record producers
American mezzo-sopranos
21st-century Trinidad and Tobago actors